Albert Batteux (2 July 1919 – 28 February 2003) was a French football midfielder and a manager. He is the most successful manager in the history of Ligue 1 having won eight domestic titles, twice reaching the European Cup final and a third-place finish at the 1958 World Cup.

Honours

Player
Reims
Division 1: 1948–49
Coupe de France: 1950

Manager
Reims
Division 1: 1952–53, 1954–55, 1957–58, 1959–60, 1961–62
Coupe de France: 1958
Latin Cup: 1953
European Cup runner-up: 1956, 1959

France
1958 FIFA World Cup: third place
1960 European Nations' Cup: fourth place

Saint-Étienne
Division 1: 1967–68, 1968–69, 1969–70
Coupe de France: 1968, 1970

References

External links
 
 
  

1919 births
2003 deaths
Sportspeople from Reims
French footballers
France international footballers
Association football midfielders
Stade de Reims players
Ligue 1 players
Ligue 2 players
French football managers
Stade de Reims managers
AS Saint-Étienne managers
France national football team managers
1958 FIFA World Cup managers
1960 European Nations' Cup managers
Grenoble Foot 38 managers
OGC Nice managers
Olympique de Marseille managers
Ligue 1 managers
AC Avigonnnais managers
Footballers from Grand Est